State Route 331 (SR 331, OH 331) is an east–west state highway in the eastern portion of the U.S. state of Ohio.

Route description
Along its way, State Route 331 passes through portions of Harrison and Belmont Counties.  There are no stretches of State Route 331 that are incorporated within the National Highway System, a system of highways determined to be most important for the country's economy, mobility and defense.

History
State Route 331 made its debut in 1932.  Originally, the highway ran from its current western terminus at U.S. Route 22 northwest of Holloway to its current western junction with State Route 149 in Flushing.  In 1939, State Route 331 took on the shape that it has today when it was extended southeasterly from Flushing to its current eastern terminus at U.S. Route 40 west of Saint Clairsville.

Major intersections

References

External links

State Route 331 Endpoint Photos

331
Transportation in Belmont County, Ohio
Transportation in Harrison County, Ohio